Allison Hossack (born January 26, 1965) is a Canadian actress.

Early years
Born in Steinbach, Manitoba, Canada, Hossack grew up in Killarney, Manitoba, and participated in musical theatre productions while a student there. She began her studies at Brandon University as a piano major but changed to a major in voice. Then she tried drama, and she later said, "By the time I graduated I was only interested in acting." She graduated from Brandon with a degree in music, after which she studied at Banff School of Fine Arts.

Career 
Following her collegiate studies, Hossack worked on stage at venues including the Muskoka Festival in Ontario and the Rainbow Stage in Winnipeg.

Her television roles include Another World from 1989 to 1992; Cobra from 1993 to 1994; Profit in 1996; Hope Island in 1999; and Stephen King's Kingdom Hospital in 2004. She starred in the Canadian TV series,
Falcon Beach in 2006. Hossack has made guest appearances on television shows such as Sliders, Mysterious Ways, Da Vinci's Inquest, The Outer Limits, Eureka, Stargate SG-1, Stargate: Atlantis, and Fringe. She played Mrs. Oliver on the TV series Reaper.
She also played Deanna Campbell, the mother of Mary Winchester and the maternal grandmother of Dean Winchester and Sam Winchester on the CW paranormal/horror series Supernatural. Also a singer, Hossack resides in Toronto.

Personal life 
Hossack married Jamie Ollivier, a writer and stand-up comic.

Filmography

Movies

Television shows

References

External links
 

Living people
Canadian women singers
Canadian soap opera actresses
Canadian television actresses
People from Steinbach, Manitoba
Actresses from Manitoba
Brandon University alumni
Canadian stage actresses
1965 births